Juvenilia is a 1943 Argentine comedy-drama film directed by Augusto César Vatteone. One of the most critically acclaimed Argentine films of 1943, at the 1944 Argentine Film Critics Association Awards the film won the Silver Condor Award for Best Film, Best Director for Vatteone, Best Supporting Actor for Eloy Álvarez and Best Adapted Screenplay for writers Pedro E. Pico, Manuel Agromayor and Alfredo de la Guardia.

Cast
Elisa Christian Galvé
José Olarra
Ernesto Vilches
Eloy Álvarez
Ricardo Passano
Hugo Pimentel
Mario Medrano
Rafael Frontaura
Gregorio Verdi
Domingo Márquez

References

External links
 

1943 films
1940s Spanish-language films
Argentine black-and-white films
Films directed by Augusto César Vatteone
Argentine comedy-drama films
1943 comedy-drama films
Films set in schools
Films about Catholicism
Silver Condor Award for Best Film winners
1940s Argentine films